Adam Phillips may refer to the following people:

Adam Phillips (animator) (born 1971), Australian animator, known as Chluaid online
Adam Phillips (psychologist) (born 1954), British child psychotherapist, literary critic, and essayist
Adam Phillips (musician), British jazz and blues guitarist and singer
Adam Phillips (footballer) (born 1998), English footballer